is a Japanese sports official and retired freestyle wrestler who won the world bantamweight title in 1965. He is vice president of the Japanese Olympic Committee, where he heads the National Training Center Commission. He is also president of Japan Wrestling Federation and vice president of the International Federation of Associated Wrestling (FILA). He served as chef de mission for the Japanese teams at the 2008 Summer Olympics and 2005 East Asian Games.

References

1941 births
Living people
Japanese male sport wrestlers
World Wrestling Champions
World Wrestling Championships medalists
Presidents of the Japan Wrestling Federation